is a former Japanese football player.

Club statistics

Honours
 A Lyga Runner-up: 2001 2002
 Lithuanian Football Cup champions : 2001

References

External links

1976 births
Living people
Teikyo University alumni
Association football people from Hiroshima Prefecture
Japanese footballers
J2 League players
Yokohama FC players
FC Machida Zelvia players
Japanese expatriate footballers
Association football forwards